Neeta Kadam (Devanagari: नीता कदम) is a former Test and One Day International cricketer who represented India. She is a right-hand batsman and has played one Test and two ODIs.

References

India women Test cricketers
India women One Day International cricketers
Indian women cricketers
Living people
1961 births